Cargojet operates a domestic scheduled cargo service to 15 Canadian destinations. Cargojet also operates an international scheduled cargo network which includes routes to several countries and territories, including Bermuda, Cuba, Germany, Japan, Mexico, the United Kingdom, and the United States of America.

References 

Lists of airline destinations